= Die Arbeider en arm boer =

1935 Afrikaans monthly publication

Die Arbeider en arm boer (meaning The Workers and Poor farmers in English) was an Afrikaans-language monthly publication issued by the Communist Party of South Africa. Five issues were published between January–June 1935. The magazine was headquartered in Johannesburg. It is described as having an aim to attract poor, Afrikaans-speaking whites to join the communist party.
